The Villa Marina Hotel is a high-rise building in Ensenada, Baja California. It serves primarily as hotel for tourists to the city and is located adjacent to the Port of Ensenada.

It is located within the central business district of Ensenada and is the tallest building within the downtown area, though not in the city.

See also

 List of hotels in Mexico
 List of companies of Mexico

References

External links

Ensenada, Baja California
Hotels in Mexico
Buildings and structures in Baja California

Hotel buildings completed in 1987
Hotels established in 1987